Miriam Welte (born 9 December 1986) is a German track cyclist.

Career
At the 2012 UCI Track Cycling World Championships in Melbourne, Welte and Kristina Vogel won the gold medal in the team sprint. They set a world record in qualifying which they broke again in the final.

On 22 June 2012, she set a new world record of 10.643 seconds in the individual sprint event.

At the 2012 Summer Olympics, she and Vogel won the team sprint gold medal.

Welte was trained by her step-father, Frank Ziegler.  In 2002, she finished second in the German National Junior 500 m time trial.  From 2006 to 2008, she won the senior version of the event.

Major Results

2008
UEC European U23 Track Championships
1st Keirin
1st Sprint
2nd 500m Time Trial
2014
1st Keirin, Oberhausen
Dudenhofen
1st Keirin
1st Sprint
1st Team Sprint, Cottbuser Nächte (with Kristina Vogel)
Sprintermeeting
1st Keirin
1st Sprint
UEC European Track Championships
2nd Team Sprint (with Kristina Vogel)
3rd 500m Time Trial
3rd Sprint, Track-Cycling Challenge Grenchen
2015
2nd Team Sprint, UEC European Track Championships (with Kristina Vogel)
Internationale Radsport Meeting
2nd 500m Time Trial
3rd Keirin
3rd Sprint
2nd Keirin, Cottbuser Nächte
3rd Team Sprint, GP von Deutschland im Sprint (with Kristina Vogel)
2016
GP von Deutschland im Sprint
1st Team Sprint (with Kristina Vogel)
3rd Sprint
2nd Sprint, Track-Cycling Challenge Grenchen
Cottbuser SprintCup
2nd 500m Time Trial
3rd Sprint
3rd Team Sprint, UCI World Track Championships

2017
UEC European Track Championships
1st 500m Time Trial
2nd Team Sprint (with Kristina Vogel)
GP von Deutschland im Sprint
1st Team Sprint (with Pauline Grabosch)
2nd Keirin
Siberne Eule von Ludwigshafen
1st Sprint
2nd Keirin
TROFEU CIUTAT DE BARCELONA-Memorial Miquel Poblet
1st Sprint
2nd Keirin
Track Cycling Challenge
1st Keirin
1st Sprint
UCI World Track Championships
2nd 500m Time Trial
3rd Team Sprint (with Kristina Vogel)
2nd Sprint, Dudenhofen

References

External links

1986 births
Living people
German female cyclists
People from Kaiserslautern
UCI Track Cycling World Champions (women)
Cyclists at the 2012 Summer Olympics
Cyclists at the 2016 Summer Olympics
Olympic cyclists of Germany
Olympic gold medalists for Germany
Olympic bronze medalists for Germany
Olympic medalists in cycling
Medalists at the 2012 Summer Olympics
Medalists at the 2016 Summer Olympics
Cyclists from Rhineland-Palatinate
German track cyclists
21st-century German women